Malice in the Palace is a 1949 short subject directed by Jules White starring American slapstick comedy team The Three Stooges (Moe Howard, Larry Fine and Shemp Howard). It is the 117th entry in the series released by Columbia Pictures starring the comedians, who released 190 shorts for the studio between 1934 and 1959.

Plot

The Stooges are running the Cafe Casbah Bah (a Middle Eastern restaurant) and attempting to prepare a meal for customers Hassan ben Sober (a play on Hasan-i Sabbah) and Ginna Rumma (Gin rummy). The meal turns out disastrous: their spaghetti dinner is spilled all over the customers' faces, so the stooges offer them a replacement meal: rabbit and hot dogs. Because a stray cat and dog make noises at inopportune times while Larry prepares the meal, Larry's meal appears to be actual dog and cat meat, which brings Moe and Shemp great grief when ordered to eat it by their customers.

These two customers are thieves intent on robbing the tomb of King Rootintootin (Tutankhamun's mummy), which contains a priceless diamond. Because of their fear of a curse on the diamond, they decide they need three stooges to carry out the deed; the bumbling Moe, Larry and Shemp prove to be perfect for the job. Before ben Sober and Rumma can reveal their scheme, they discover that the Emir of Shmow has already gotten his hands on the diamond. The two plotters start wailing and, when ben Sober reveals his actual career as a doorman of the Oasis hotel (and not the royalty Moe thinks he is), he and his accomplice are thrown out of the restaurant. The Stooges then attempt to steal the diamond back from the Emir, since it is government property and would likely fetch a large reward.

The Stooges arrive at the Emir's palace dressed as Santa Claus. They then manage to acquire the diamond and make a quick exit, but not before dealing with a burly guard.

Cast

Credited

Production notes
Malice in the Palace was filmed on June 8–11, 1948. It was remade in 1956 as Rumpus in the Harem, using ample stock footage from the original. Footage was reused from Wee Wee Monsieur when the Stooges arrive at a palace disguised as Santa Clauses in a sleigh being pulled by a horse wearing reindeer antlers.

Curly Howard's cameo

According to The Three Stooges Journal, a part was written for Former Stooge Curly Howard after his brief cameo in 1947's Hold That Lion!. The lobby card photo noticeably features a slim, mustachioed Curly as an angry chef. However, his illness caused his scenes to be cut (another story is that Moe Howard decided that "The Four Stooges" could not be sustained). A scene closely resembling the lobby card is in the finished film (with Hassan ben Sober in Curly's stead); ultimately Larry assumed the role as the chef. This was the last time Curly was considered for a performance with the trio until his death in 1952.

Copyright status
Malice in the Palace is one of four Columbia Stooge shorts that fell into the public domain after their copyright expired in the 1960s, the other three being Sing a Song of Six Pants, Brideless Groom (both 1947), and Disorder in the Court (1936). As such, these four shorts frequently appear on budget VHS and DVD compilations.

In popular culture

Malice in the Palace was one of five Stooge films included in the TBS 1995 Halloween special The Three Stooges Fright Night along with Spooks (1953), If a Body Meets a Body (1945), We Want Our Mummy (1939), and The Hot Scots (1948).

The 2004 NBA brawl between the Indiana Pacers and the Detroit Pistons has come to be known as the Malice at the Palace, a play on the title of this short and a reference to the fact that the event happened at The Palace of Auburn Hills.

This short was seen in a movie theater in The Garbage Pail Kids Movie.

See also
 Public domain film
 List of American films of 1949
 List of films in the public domain in the United States

References

External links 

 
 
 

1949 films
1949 comedy films
The Three Stooges films
1940s English-language films
American black-and-white films
Films directed by Jules White
Columbia Pictures short films
Films with screenplays by Felix Adler (screenwriter)
American slapstick comedy films
1940s American films